Jessica Simpson's The Price of Beauty is an American documentary reality series that followed singer Jessica Simpson and her two best friends Ken Pavés and CaCee Cobb as they traveled worldwide "to meet women, study local fashions, dietary fads and beauty regimes," all in an attempt to explore the meaning of true beauty in different cultures. It was Simpson's return to the reality television genre that she had had success in six years earlier on MTV's Newlyweds: Nick & Jessica. Simpson also sang the official theme song, entitled "Who We Are".

Episodes
Simpson and her friends traveled around the world in search of cultural beauty. Each episode focused on a different country, ending with Simpson bringing members of each episode back to L.A for the final episode. In the series finale - Simpson gave Panya, a woman from Thailand with a skin condition, a makeover to make her more confident within herself. The show ended with a modelling runway with guests walking down. Simpson then announced a charity project, along with Operation Smile, entitled "A Beautiful Me" to help people worldwide.

Season 1

Around the World

'The Price of Beauty' was picked up by MTV all over the globe in 23 different countries, all premiering in July. 'The Price of Beauty' premiered Sunday the 11th of July 2010 in the UK. It is still repeated on MTV UK as of January 2011.

References

External links
 

2010 American television series debuts
2010 American television series endings
2010s American reality television series
English-language television shows
Jessica Simpson
Television series by Banijay
VH1 original programming